The Upper Deck Company, LLC (colloquially as Upper Deck and Upper Deck Authenticated, Ltd. in the UK), founded in 1988, is a private company primarily known for producing trading cards. Its headquarters are in Carlsbad, California, United States.

The company also produces sports related items such as figurines and die-cast toys on top of having exclusive agreements to produce memorabilia (under the brand name "Upper Deck Authenticated") with such athletes as Michael Jordan, Tiger Woods, LeBron James, Ben Simmons, Wayne Gretzky, Connor McDavid and Serena Williams. Under the Upper Deck Entertainment name, the company also produced card games such as World of Warcraft and Vs. System.

Upper Deck is also the current licensor of the O-Pee-Chee brand since 2007, having released several baseball and ice hockey card collections.

Company history
On December 23, 1988, Upper Deck was granted a license by Major League Baseball to produce baseball cards, and just two months later, on February 23, 1989, delivered its first two cases of baseball cards to George Moore of Tulsa's Baseball Card Store in Tulsa, Oklahoma. Their inaugural 1989 set stood out from other trading cards with its glossy fronts on heavy-duty cardboard (thicker than other card stocks), with an additional color photo on the back of each card and a counterfeit-proof tiny hologram marking. Upper Deck sold out its baseball cards midway through this inaugural year, then pre-sold its entire 1990 baseball stock before the year began.

The 1990 set included the industry's first randomly inserted personally autographed and numbered cards of sports superstars. All Upper Deck brands bear an exclusive trademark hologram, and Upper Deck was named "Card Set of the Year" every year from 1989 to 2004.

Paul Sumner created the Upper Deck concept in 1987. He worked in printing sales and came up with the idea for a premium card. When he heard about card counterfeiting, he realized that he knew a way to protect cards. He had studied holograms in college and had used them in printing his company's brochures. He hired Robert Young Pelton to design and produce a prototype. Pelton designed and produced the cards for Upper Decks first three-year rise.  Pelton's agencies, Pelton & Associates and Digital Artists, were replaced by Chiat/Day. Paul Sumner resigned with the understanding that he would be known as the "Co-Founder of Upper Deck", something that the company's owner and CEO, Richard McWilliam, recognized until McWilliam's death in 2013.

On March 20, 1990, The Upper Deck Company was granted licenses by the National Hockey League and National Hockey League Players Association to produce hockey cards. The company also obtained licenses from the National Football League and the National Basketball Association in 1990, making the Upper Deck Company the first trading card company in 10 years to be licensed by all four leagues. Upper Deck established itself so quickly that it rivaled Topps, which had been considered the standard, and other companies such as Fleer, Donruss and Score.

After Upper Deck introduced its premium baseball series, other companies followed with improved photography, better design and higher-quality paper stock. The sports card market grew from $50 million in 1980 when Topps's monopoly was broken by Fleer, to a $1.5 billion industry in 1992.  Hall of Famer Reggie Jackson, served as an adviser in the early 1990s. Jackson would also serve as the inspiration for the first certified autograph card inserted into trading cards with the company's "Find the Reggie" campaign. A massively successful promotion for the Upper Deck brand, the triple portrait of Jackson, remains an iconic image among baseball card collectors.

At the beginning of the 1992–93 NHL season, Upper Deck made Patrick Roy a spokesperson. Roy was an ideal choice as he was a hockey card collector, and his collection amounted to over 150,000 cards. An ad campaign was launched and it had an adverse effect on Patrick Roy's season. Upper Deck had a slogan called “Trade Roy”, and it was posted on billboards throughout the city of Montreal. A Journal de Montreal poll, published on January 13, 1993, indicated that 57% of fans favoured trading Patrick Roy. Before the trading deadline, Canadiens General Manager Serge Savard insisted that he would consider a trade for Roy. The Canadiens ended the season by winning only 8 of their last 19 games.

Upper Deck was also the first to insert swatches of game-used material into cards when it made jersey cards in 1997 UD Basketball. The insert set was called Game Jersey and a similar set followed in baseball the next year, where UD cut up game-used jerseys of Ken Griffey Jr., Tony Gwynn and Rey Ordóñez.

In 1999, Upper Deck Company spent in excess of $1.1 million in acquiring vintage baseball memorabilia items at the Barry Halper Collection auction held at Sotheby's in New York City. One of the items was a Ty Cobb jersey that Upper Deck paid $332,500 for. As part of a sweepstakes prize, it gave the jersey to 14-year-old Robert Shell of Milwaukee. At the time, the estimated tax Robert was going to pay on the prize was $125,000. The amount, his mother said, would force the family to sell the jersey.

In May 2005, Richard McWilliam was honored at the sports collectible industry's annual trade convention in Hawaii as the industry's "most influential" person of the past 20 years. In addition to McWilliam's award, Upper Deck was also recognized for the debut of its legendary 1989 baseball trading card set, which included the then 19-year-old centerfielder Ken Griffey Jr., as the "most influential" event of the past 20 years. The list of nominees was created and voted upon by the editorial sports staff of F+W Publications (organizers of the conference and the parent organization of popular collectibles magazines such as Sports Collectors Digest, Trade Fax, Tuff Stuff, and Card Trade).

In July 2005, Upper Deck won the liquidation auction of former competitor Fleer-SkyBox International's brand name, assets, and business model, as well as the Fleer collectibles die-cast business assets. In March 2007, Upper Deck made an offer to buy competitor Topps, competing with Madison Dearborn Partners and Tornante Company, the eventual buyer.

Upper Deck originally included the year of the trading card set's release on its logo, with the "19" above "Upper" and the last two digits of the year under "Deck" (but both inside the green diamond). This practice was dropped midway through the 1994 season. In 2008, Upper Deck retired the green diamond logo and replaced it with a new design that it could better use to market all of its products.

In 2009, Upper Deck introduced the Diamond Club. Diamond Club members consist of the top individual purchasers and collectors of Upper Deck and Fleer brands throughout the United States, Canada and Japan. The criteria were that the members distinguished themselves not only by the amount of money they spent, but by how they helped to promote these products within the hobby and to other collectors. Diamond Club members receive special promotional items, receive invitations to special events and are invited to an annual summit where they can share ideas with members of Upper Deck while participating in a special reception with one of the company's spokesmen. Fewer than 125 members are chosen to be a part of the program each year.

On August 6, 2009, Major League Baseball announced it entered into a multi-year deal with Topps giving it exclusive rights to produce MLB trading cards. Upper Deck would retain its rights to produce cards bearing player likenesses via its contract with the MLBPA but will be unable to use team logos or other trademarked images. On February 1, 2010, Major League Baseball filed a federal lawsuit against Upper Deck for trademark infringement. A mutual settlement was announced on March 3, 2010, stating that Upper Deck could continue selling its three current baseball card series (2009 Signature Stars, 2009 Ultimate Collection and 2010 Upper Deck Series One), although they are prohibited from using any MLB trademarks (including team logos and names) in any of their future baseball products. Despite this limitation, Upper Deck commented that they would still continue to produce baseball-related cards without the use of those trademarks.

On September 29, 2009, Upper Deck created the company's first-ever packs of Finnish- and Swedish-language Victory hockey cards to go on sale in those markets.

In February 2010, Blizzard Entertainment ended its licensing deal with Upper Deck. Upper Deck had previously produced the World of Warcraft trading card game.

On April 7, 2010, Upper Deck announced it would no longer be licensed to produce NFL trading cards.  Upper Deck spokesperson Terry Melia noted on his Twitter account that, "UD was unable to come to terms with NFL Properties. No NFL Properties-licensed football cards from UD in 2010."  Upper Deck owner Richard McWilliam said, "Over the past year, Upper Deck has attempted to negotiate a new licensing deal with NFL Properties.  Unfortunately, despite our best efforts, we were not able to reach agreeable terms, and therefore will not be issuing any NFL Properties-licensed trading cards for the 2010 season. Upper Deck will continue to focus on its exclusive license agreement with the Collegiate Licensing Company and co-exclusive agreements with NHL Enterprises and the NHL Players Association, as well as its multiple entertainment licenses.”

On January 8, 2015, Panini America acquired the Collegiate Licensing Company exclusive trading card agreement that Upper Deck formerly owned.

DeWayne Buice
DeWayne Buice, then a California Angels pitcher, would later become one of Upper Deck's founding partners. In November 1987, Buice walked into The Upper Deck, a trading card store.  Store owner Bill Hemrick noticed Buice and the two struck up a friendship, one that led to Buice's hosting an autograph session at the store.  Within weeks, Buice had become one of Hemrick's business partners.
Hemrick and his partner Paul Sumner were in the process of starting Upper Deck. Unfortunately, the two lacked the business and personal connections to help land the necessary Major League Baseball Players Association (MLBPA) license, which would allow Upper Deck to use players' names and likenesses on its cards. The only response they received was that the players' union was not accepting another card company for three more years. Buice was told that if he could help secure the license, he would receive a 12 percent stake in the card company.  Buice would become a key figure in getting MLBPA officials to agree to a meeting. By the end of the 1988 season, Hemrick and Sumner received the license and by 1989, were making baseball cards.

By the time Buice retired from professional baseball at the end of the 1989 season, he had collected $2.8 million from Upper Deck.  Believing the company owed him even more money, Buice sued Upper Deck executives.  After the battle over Buice's stake in the company was settled in court, he became a millionaire who reportedly made $17 million on the deal, far more than he ever made as a baseball player. In two-and-a-half seasons with the Angels, Buice made $212,500.

Upper Deck was originally scheduled to pay Buice his millions over a four-year period, but due to the 1994 baseball strike, Upper Deck's business stalled. Buice then agreed to a six-year payment plan.  Sales in 1995 and 1996 fell so far that for those two years, virtually all the company's profits went to Buice.

On the day in 1998 that Upper Deck cut Buice his final check, the company threw a party at its Carlsbad, California, headquarters. The top brass ordered employees to work just a half day.  Later that year at the Christmas party, Upper Deck CEO Richard McWilliam told employees the company's deal with Buice was the worst deal it had ever done.

1989 set and Ken Griffey Jr.
In the 1989 Upper Deck baseball set, Ken Griffey Jr. was selected to be featured on card number one. The decision to make Griffey Jr. the first card was reached in late 1988.

A teenage employee named Tom Geideman was the one who suggested the use of Griffey as its choice for the number-one card. Traditionally, Topps had a system for reserving various numbers in their sets (such as numbers 1 and 100) for the biggest stars in the game. Geideman decided that a top prospect should be honored with the number one card in the inaugural 1989 set. After reviewing Baseball America, Geideman narrowed the list of candidates to four: Gregg Jefferies of the New York Mets, Gary Sheffield of the Milwaukee Brewers, Sandy Alomar Jr. of the San Diego Padres, and Ken Griffey Jr. Geideman was a Mariners fan and decided that Ken Griffey Jr. should be the prospect featured on card number one of the 1989 set.

At press time, Griffey had not yet played a major league game, so Upper Deck used an image of Griffey in a San Bernardino Spirit uniform. Competitors such as Score and Topps neglected to include a card of Griffey in their regular 1989 sets. Both brands would make a card of Griffey in their end of year Traded sets. Such neglect helped Upper Deck gain exposure due to the popularity of Griffey in the 1989 MLB season.

Despite the popularity of the Griffey card, it was not a scarce card. The card was situated in the top left hand corner of the uncut sheets and was more liable to be cut poorly or have its corners dinged. Company policy was that if a customer found a damaged card in its package, the company would replace it. Many Griffey cards were returned and the result was that Upper Deck printed many uncut sheets (sheets consisting of 100 cards) of just the Griffey card. According to Professional Sports Authenticator (PSA), the Ken Griffey Jr. card would become the most graded card of all time with the company; PSA graded over 50,000 of the cards. The Beckett Grading card service has evaluated over 25,000 of the Ken Griffey Jr. rookie cards.

High end sports cards and insert sets

Memorabilia and relic cards
Upper Deck has changed its practice of using materials certified as "Worn" by the player depicted on the front of the card.  The changed wording on the backs of Upper Deck insert cards makes it less clear as to how the materials were used or what player wore the item.

EXAMPLE: Steve Nash card 2004 (back of card): On the front of this card is an authentic piece of a jersey WORN by Steve Nash as a member of the Dallas Mavericks in an NBA game.
EXAMPLE: Jermaine O'Neal card 2006 Exquisite (back of card)" On the front of this is a piece of memorabilia that has been certified to us as having been USED in an NBA game.

Upper Deck's authenticity has been questioned in regards to players' jersey and uniform materials, but with no real founding.  The cards state that the inserted items are known to Upper Deck to have been used or worn, and authenticity is certified by third-party memorabilia vendors.  Some of Upper Deck's jersey materials are harvested at events like rookie photo shoots, during such events, players will wear provided uniforms to generate event-worn material that never sees the field of play, but these practices are reserved to rookies or retired players.

Collectors still debate and question the authenticity of such 'memorabilia", which often includes items manufactured specifically for insert cards, patches, and other desirable content.

NBA Exquisite Collection
Upper Deck premiered its NBA Exquisite Collection line in the 2003–2004 season. Each pack contained five basketball cards; one veteran base card numbered to 225, one autographed rookie card featuring a piece of patch worn by the player numbered to 99 or 225, one game worn jersey card, one autographed/patch insert card, and a fifth card that was either a low numbered parallel or an additional autographed patch card. Suggested retail price of the product was $500, making it the most expensive basketball card product ever produced at the time (the few packs that remain unopened now sell for over $4,000). Autograph cards include veterans such as Michael Jordan, Patrick Ewing, Kobe Bryant, Kevin Garnett, LeBron James, Dwyane Wade, and Carmelo Anthony. The most sought after cards from the line include the autographed/patch rookie cards numbered to 99 (LeBron James, Darko Milicic, Carmelo Anthony, Chris Bosh, Dwyane Wade, and Udonis Haslem), the Limited Logos inserts which feature an extra large jersey patch piece and autograph, and the autographed/patch rookie parallels serial numbered to the player's jersey number.

Other Exquisite Collection series
In view of the Exquisite series' success, the company has released 2004–05 and 2005–06 basketball sets, a 2005 football line, and an analogous 2005–06 hockey line called The Cup. The football line, which includes autographed rookie "patch" cards, is the most popular of the series. Variants of these cards, called the Gold Series, are limited to runs of 25 or 99 cards. The company's Exquisite-branded baseball series were introduced first as premiums in lower-end Upper Deck products (including the company's SP Legendary Cuts and Artifacts Baseball lines). In late 2007, the company added another line to its Exquisite Collections brand, focused on rookie players. This recent addition is retailed at US$249 per pack.

Baseball Yankee Stadium Legacy
The Yankee Stadium Legacy set is a 6,742-card compilation chronicling every single game ever played at Yankee Stadium. The card set was manufactured by Upper Deck and made its official debut by being inserted in random packs of Upper Deck's 2008 Series 1 Baseball.

Other cards in the set commemorate some of the most famous sporting events that have taken place at Yankee Stadium. Some of these events include: Lou Gehrig's "Luckiest Man Alive" Speech (July 4, 1939); Babe Ruth's "Final Visit to Yankee Stadium" (June 11, 1948); Joe Louis vs. Max Schmeling heavyweight title bout (June 19, 1936, Schmeling won), the 1958 NFL Championship between the New York Giants and the Baltimore Colts and Muhammad Ali's title defense against Ken Norton (Sept. 28, 1976).

Guinness World Records will certify The Yankee Stadium Legacy as the largest baseball card set ever produced, once all the cards are released. The official recognition will take place only after all of the 6,500 cards are released in Upper Deck's various baseball card launches throughout the year.

The various sets where the Yankee Stadium Legacy cards were inserted into were: Spectrum; Piece of History; SPx; Upper Deck Series Two; SP Legendary Cuts (hobby-only); SP Authentic; UDx; and UD Masterpieces. Upper Deck started a website so that collectors could find out more about the Yankee Stadium Legacy set. Alphanumeric codes found on the backs of Yankee Stadium Legacy cards can be entered at the site, and collectors would be able to use the site to manage their collections online, and track their collections against other collectors via a leader board.

Tommy Baxter, a 36-year-old from Little Rock, Arkansas, was the first collector to put together Upper Deck's Yankee Stadium Legacy (YSL) Collection.

NHL Biography of a Season
The NHL Biography of a Season cards was a 30-card set capturing the greatest moments of the 2008-09 NHL Season. The cards were available through Upper Deck Certified Diamond Dealers. A collector had to redeem five wrappers of 2008/2009 Upper Deck hockey cards at a participating hobby store and receive an exclusive Upper Deck Biography of a Season card. One new card was available every week throughout the NHL season. The first four cards were:
Alexander Ovechkin - NHL single-season record 65 goals by LW
Henrik Zetterberg - 2008 Conn Smythe winner
Detroit Red Wings - Stanley Cup team photo
Steven Stamkos - 1st overall pick in 2008 Draft

20th Anniversary Program
In observance of its 20th anniversary in 2009, Upper Deck released a set that can be found in all of the company's 2009 baseball trading card releases. The massive 2,500 card set commemorated the last 20 years in sports, pop culture, politics, world history and technology. The first cards from the 20th Anniversary Retrospective set were found in 2009 Upper Deck Series One Baseball. An additional element to the set was the 100-card memorabilia set that was found in all sets beginning with 2009 Upper Deck Spectrum Baseball (released on February 24).

NBA Michael Jordan Legacy
In April 2009, the company announcement that longtime company spokesman Michael Jordan would be honored with an 1,170-card tribute insert set chronicling every single Chicago Bulls game Jordan played in. The set will begin with his NBA debut on October 26, 1984, through his final Bulls appearance in Game 6 of the NBA Finals on June 14, 1998.
The 1,170-card set will pack out across four 2009 Upper Deck basketball products: Lineage (April 1); Radiance (April 29); Upper Deck (Sept. 22); and First Edition (Sept. 29). Each of the cards will include Jordan's specific box score stats from the game in question. Every card in the set will be given some historical significance as the overall set captures every game Jordan ever played with the Bulls, regular-season and playoff battles included. The cards will fall, on average, 1:4 packs across all four brands.

In addition to the 1,170 Jordan game cards, Upper Deck also included 100 different game-used memorabilia cards, each one crash-numbered to 23. The cards will sport swatches from Jordan's game-worn jerseys. More than 100 different action photos showing Jordan through the years were used for card front photography.

Acquired brands

Konami
Upper Deck acquired the rights to distribute the Yu-Gi-Oh! Trading Card Game from Konami in 2002. That same year, second quarter American sales reached $17 million.

In October 2008, Konami sued Vintage Sports Cards for distributing Yu-Gi-Oh! Trading Game Cards, along with counterfeit cards. The cards were found in a Los Angeles Toys-R-Us. Vintage denied any wrongdoing, claiming they legally obtained all cards (counterfeits included) directly from Upper Deck. Konami added Upper Deck as defendants on December 11. December 2008, Konami announced they were assuming full control over Yu-Gi-Oh! TCG, which includes distribution and customer support. In response, Upper Deck filed a $75 million suit against Konami in Nevada District Court.

In a January 26, 2009 press release Upper Deck denied allegations of counterfeiting, and stated that Upper Deck would support the Yu-Gi-Oh! community in an upcoming event. On February 26, 2009, Upper Deck was ordered to cease distribution of Yu-Gi-Oh! products, stop using Konami's trademarks and stop promoting itself as an authorized distributor or rights-holder to Yu-Gi-Oh!.

On January 10, 2010, Judge Valerie Baker Fairbank ruled in a US District Court that Upper Deck had counterfeited the cards, and additionally threw out Upper Deck's countersuit alleging breach of the distribution agreement.  The next stage of the case began on January 26, 2010, where a jury was to decide whether Upper Deck was liable for counterfeiting the cards.  During the opening statement for the defense, Upper Deck's attorney, Richard Howell of Rutan & Tucker stated "The behavior is still undeniably wrong. And I am in here, as counsel for the two defendants, asking you to hold my clients accountable for that behavior; asking you to hold my clients responsible for this conduct that there is no dispute, and there was no disputing even before this case started today, that it was wrong." After the second day of court proceedings, Konami and Upper Deck reached an out-of-court settlement. The terms were not publicly disclosed.

Maxx racing cards 
Maxx produced racing cards from 1988 to 1996. Upper Deck started producing racing cards in 1995, acquired the Maxx brand in December 1996 and discontinued the line in 2000.

O-Pee-Chee 
Upper Deck became licensor of the O-Pee-Chee brand in 2007, after the original Canadian company was sold to Nestlé in 1996. O-Pee-Chee's collections of baseball and ice hockey cards had been commercialised by Topps from 1997 to 2004. Since Upper Deck succeeded Topps as licensor, it has released several collections up to the present day.

Other brands

Upper Deck Entertainment
Upper Deck Entertainment (UDE), a division of The Upper Deck Company, used to produce the English, Spanish, Portuguese, German, Italian, and French language versions of the Yu-Gi-Oh! Trading Card Game, a collectible card game, licensed from Konami. Other collectible card games have included the Winx Club trading card game for girls, which has since been canceled, the World of Warcraft Trading Card Game based on the popular MMORPG.  UDE lost this license in early 2010. The Marvel Trading Card Game and the DC Comics Trading Card Game, using their proprietary VS System, was canceled in early 2009. It has since been relaunched as VS. System 2PCG. In October 2005, UDE introduced a trading card game based on Nickelodeon's Avatar: The Last Airbender series and the Pirates of the Caribbean films. It has also released many non-game oriented sports-based and multimedia companion trading card sets.

The Entertainment department was all but dissolved in March 2010 citing layoffs for a large number of employees. After about a year of hibernation, the Entertainment Department began to rebuild and gained traction again in board gaming with the release of Legendary: A Marvel Deck Building Game Earning industry awards and securing large scale mass market placement, the company was back in the driver's seat. Eventually, the department entered the mobile game market with Legendary: DXP.

Upper Deck Digital
Upper Deck Digital technology includes the PenCam, an authentication system and the e-Card, a trading card with a virtual twin.  They also provide Personalized Trading Card, allowing amateur sports fans to go online and create their own Upper Deck trading card. WebPass is a technology that turns an invisible watermark on a trading card into the collector's key into secret websites.

Upper Deck International
In 1991, Upper Deck introduced its products to the global marketplace with the creation of Upper Deck Europe, headquartered in the Netherlands. With an office in Amsterdam and distribution throughout Europe, Asia and India, the company markets and sells TCG's, Toys, Games and Collectibles that are geared to local consumers. The emphasis is less on sports items and more on toys and games.

The organization changed its name to Upper Deck International in 2008, reflecting an increasingly broader outlook than Europe alone.
In addition to EMEA, Upper Deck International  is responsible for Oceania, Japan and Latin America. With offices in Berlin, Paris, London, Milan, Tokyo, Sydney and São Paulo the company is optimally organized for distribution across the globe. Upper Deck International lost the Yu-Gi-Oh license as well in 2009.

On February 14, 2012, Upper Deck International declared bankruptcy.

Upper Deck Kids
In April 2006, Upper Deck created Upper Deck Kids with the slogan "Get More Than Lucky." Kids could enter codes printed on the back of cards on the website to get points, which they can redeem for prizes. In April 2007, Upper Deck instituted a monthly limit of 1000 codes, and adults became ineligible to sign up. New rewards are usually added weekly. Prizes in the past included autographed memorabilia, sports card boxes, screensavers, desktop wallpapers, video games, and systems, among others. The website also encourages you to buy sports cards. Each prize is worth a different amount. Upper Deck Kids also has message boards where kids can talk about sports, trade codes, gossip, etc. Also, Upper Deck implemented a limit on how many invalid codes you can enter due to multiple hackers that wrote code-cracking programs to guess all the possible codes and take all the prizes for themselves.
Additionally, Upper Deck announced that children are no longer able to redeem Upper Deck product codes from 2006 for points on the kids' website to avoid "code sharing" amongst members. Code sharing involves publishing massive lists of free codes posted on third-party sites that can be used to redeem vast numbers of points. Trading of codes also takes place on the website. Also, to encourage kids to buy the most recent Upper Deck products, codes from the backs of cards older than six months are worth half of their original rewards points value.

Trading cards

Sports 
Upper Deck has covered a wide range of sports through its trading cards collections, currently focusing on few of them. Some of the collections released by the company include:

Non-sports 
{| class="wikitable sortable" width="800px"
|-
! width=150px| Group
! width=650px| Licenses
|-
| Artists || Christina Aguilera, Ricky Martin
|-
| Comics || Avengers Assemble!, Deadpool, Marvel Comics|-
| Games || World of Warcraft|-
| Movies || Avengers: Age of Ultron, Avengers: Infinity War, Alien, Guardians of the Galaxy, James Bond 007, Space Jam, Spider-Man 2|-
| Miscellaneous || GrossOut|-
| TV programs || American Idol, X-Files, Dinosaur King|}

Lawsuits
Under the executive direction of McWilliam, Upper Deck became known as a litigious company. Stars like Mickey Mantle, Kareem Abdul-Jabbar and Ted Williams, Upper Deck employees, vendors and even licensors were forced to the courts to settle simple disputes with McWilliam. Pelton & Associates successfully froze all of Upper Deck's product shipments after they proved to the court that they actually owned the custom logos, designs and packaging and that Upper Deck had not paid them.

Konami - After Upper Deck admitted to counterfeiting cards, the lawsuit was settled out of court.

MLB - filed a federal lawsuit in New York against Upper Deck, accusing the company of trademark infringement and illegally selling cards that feature official team logos and uniforms. The complaint also notes that Upper Deck owes MLB $2.4 million.

Kareem Abdul-Jabbar - Upper Deck used six photos of Abdul-Jabbar during his college years without permission. The photos were part of a trading card series called "Greats of the Game," which also had Abdul-Jabbar's name and signature.
"Abdul-Jabbar never authorized the production of the cards," the suit reads according to Courthouse News. "In fact, at all times, Upper Deck was fully aware that Abdul-Jabbar had never authorized Upper Deck to use his photograph, name and signature for college-themed cards, and Abdul-Jabbar had previously rejected Upper Deck's request for such authorization."
Upper Deck has yet to respond to the allegations.

American International Specialty Lines Insurance Company - This case arose out of an insurance policy that The Upper Deck Corporation (“Upper Deck”), purchased from American International Specialty Lines Insurance Company (“AISLIC”). The policy insured a tax strategy that KPMG, an accounting firm, developed for Upper Deck. The IRS investigated the tax strategy and determined that it constituted an improper tax shelter. Upper Deck then settled with the IRS for $80 million in back taxes and interest, and with the California Franchise Tax Board for $17 million in back taxes and interest.

After AISLIC rejected Upper Deck's claim that the policy covered the loss incurred as a result of the settlement, Upper Deck and its chief executive officer, Richard McWilliam, filed a complaint in the United States District Court for the Southern District of California seeking, inter alia, a declaratory judgment that the policy issued by AISLIC covered the loss. Subsequently, the district court granted AISLIC's motion to compel arbitration.

A three-member panel of arbitrators held that Upper Deck and McWilliam were not entitled to coverage because Upper Deck had abandoned the tax strategy that AISLIC had insured. The district court confirmed the arbitration award.

See also

Razor Entertainment
Topps
Topps baseball card products

Further reading
Williams, Pete. Card Sharks: How Upper Deck Turned a Child's Hobby into a High-Stakes, Billion-Dollar Business''. Macmillan General Reference, May 1995.
Lawsuit between Upper Deck and Konami: http://www.iptrademarkattorney.com/reply-konami-undisputed-facts.pdf

Notes

References

External links
 

Manufacturing companies based in California
Trading card companies
Manufacturing companies established in 1988
American companies established in 1988
1988 establishments in California
Companies based in Carlsbad, California